The R771 or Rupsha-Fakirhat-Bagerhat Highway is a transportation artery in Bangladesh, which connects National Highway N7 (at Rupsha) with Regional Highway R770 (at Bagerhat).

See also 
 N7 (Bangladesh)
 List of roads in Bangladesh

References 

Regional Highways in Bangladesh